is a former baseball player in Japan.  He primarily played for the Orix BlueWave in the Pacific League    He attended Spring Training with the Seattle Mariners.

References

1972 births
Living people
Baseball people from Hyōgo Prefecture
Japanese baseball players
Nippon Professional Baseball pitchers
Orix BlueWave players
Yakult Swallows players
Osaka Kintetsu Buffaloes players